is a Japanese video game producer and designer working for Nintendo, where he currently is Senior Officer at Nintendo EPD. 

After he had graduated from the Visual Concept Planning Department of Osaka University of Arts, he decided to enter the video game industry, and joined Nintendo in April 1986. 

At first, Tanabe was part of the Entertainment Analysis and Development division. He directed the platform games Yume Kōjō: Doki Doki Panic and Super Mario Bros. 2, and worked on the scripts for the action-adventures The Legend of Zelda: A Link to the Past and The Legend of Zelda: Link's Awakening. In 2003, Tanabe moved to the Software Planning and Development division, where he became the manager of Production Group No. 3. Since then, he has become a producer, and has managed and overseen the development of external developed first party Nintendo video games, such as Metroid Prime, Donkey Kong Country, Paper Mario, Chibi-Robo and other series.

Works

References

External links

1963 births
Japanese video game designers
Japanese video game directors
Living people
Metroid
Nintendo people
Japanese video game producers
Paper Mario
Video game writers